Admiral Football Club is an association football club based in Mombasa, Kenya. The team competes in FKF Division One and plays its home games at the Apostle Grounds.

External links

Football clubs in Kenya